The Alternative Ulster Covenant was a declaration launched at a public meeting in 1913 in reaction to the Ulster Covenant of 28 September 1912. The original Ulster Covenant, signed by just under half a million men and women from Ulster, protested against the Third Home Rule Bill, introduced by the British Government in that same year. The essence of the Alternative Covenant was to dispute the anti-Home Rule assertions made by the Ulster Covenanters. The movement is notable because it was a largely Protestant organisation, at a time when the vast majority of Protestants were anti-Home Rule.

See also
Ulster Covenant
Unionism in Ireland
Protestantism in Ireland
Partition of Ireland

References

External links
Overview of the Alternative Covenant
Copy of Roger Casement's speech
Launch of a pamphlet on the meeting

Irish nationalism
1913 in Ireland
1913 documents
Political movements in Ireland
Protestant Irish nationalists